Cypholophus is a genus of flowering plants belonging to the family Urticaceae.

Its native range is Malesia to Southern Pacific.

Species:

Cypholophus anisoneurus 
Cypholophus brunneolus 
Cypholophus caeruleus 
Cypholophus chamaephyton 
Cypholophus decipiens 
Cypholophus ellipticus 
Cypholophus englerianus 
Cypholophus friesianus 
Cypholophus gjellerupii 
Cypholophus integer 
Cypholophus kerewensis 
Cypholophus latifolius 
Cypholophus ledermannii 
Cypholophus lutescens 
Cypholophus macrocephalus 
Cypholophus melanocarpoides 
Cypholophus melanocarpus 
Cypholophus microphyllus 
Cypholophus montanus 
Cypholophus nummularis 
Cypholophus pachycarpus 
Cypholophus patens 
Cypholophus prostratus 
Cypholophus pulleanus 
Cypholophus radicans 
Cypholophus reticulatus 
Cypholophus rotundifolius 
Cypholophus rudis 
Cypholophus stipulatus 
Cypholophus trapula 
Cypholophus treubii 
Cypholophus vaccinioides 
Cypholophus velutinus 
Cypholophus vestitus 
Cypholophus warburgianus

References

Urticaceae
Urticaceae genera